Prawas Din or Surinamese Immigration Day is the day that commemorates the arrival of the first Hindu contract workers in Suriname on June 5, 1873, on the Lalla Rookh. The commemoration takes place on June 5.

See also 

 Indian Arrival Day

References

Public holidays in Suriname
History of Suriname